Pearson Field   also once known as Pearson Airpark, is a city-owned municipal airport located one mile (2 km) southeast of the central business district of Vancouver, a city in Clark County, Washington, United States.

Pearson Field is the oldest continuously operating airfield in the Pacific Northwest and one of the two oldest continuously operating airfields in the United States, receiving recognition in 2012 as an American Institute of Aeronautics and Astronautics historic aerospace site. Pearson Field's history began with the landing of a Baldwin airship, piloted by Lincoln Beachey, upon the polo grounds of the Vancouver Barracks in 1905. It is located in the Fort Vancouver National Historic Site immediately to the east of the reconstructed fort. Primarily used for general aviation, the airfield's lone runway is located directly beneath the final approach to runway 10L at nearby Portland International Airport. The airport lies adjacent to Washington State Route 14 and the Columbia River.

History 

Pearson Field's history dates back to the early 1900s and is named for local resident First Lieutenant Alexander Pearson Jr. of the United States Army.

 1905  Lincoln Beachey pilots his Baldwin airship from the grounds of the 1905 Lewis and Clark Centennial Exposition on the shores of Guild's Lake in Portland, Oregon, to Vancouver Barracks, a distance of approximately 8 miles, in the first aerial crossing of the Columbia River. This flight also set an endurance record for flight at the time. Carrying a letter from Theodore Hardee, an official of the fair, to the commandant of the Vancouver Barracks, General Constant Williams, the flight is also the recognized as the first time an airship is used to deliver a letter.
 1911  First airplane lands at Pearson Field.
 1912  A homebuilt aircraft built onsite becomes the first aircraft departure.
 1923–1941  Pearson Field is home to the US Army Air Service.
 1923  Commander Lt. Oakley G. Kelly makes the first non-stop transcontinental flight.
 1924  Pearson Field is a stopover point on the army's first round-the-world flight.
 1925  Pearson Field is named after Lt. Alexander Pearson by order of Major General John L. Hines. On 16 September 1925, during the inauguration of Pearson Field, in front of 20,000 spectators and against 53 competitor pilots, Edith Foltz won the dead-stick landing competition.
 1937  Soviet aviator Valery Chkalov lands at the end of the first non-stop transpolar flight.
 1975  Chkalov monument dedicated
 1994  City of Vancouver and National Park Service enter into agreement governing the future of Pearson Field.
 2005  Pearson Field celebrates its 100-year anniversary.
 2012  Pearson Field receives AIAA historic aerospace site designation.
 2015  AIAA monument placed.
 2016  Former State Representative John McKibbin, along with Irene Mustain, depart from the field; their plane crashes in the Columbia River.

Facilities and aircraft 
For the 12-month period ending May 31, 2006, the airport had 52,200 aircraft operations, an average of 143 per day: 97% general aviation, 2% military and 1% air taxi. At that time there were 175 aircraft based at this airport: 97% single-engine and 3% multi-engine.

The airfield has a 150 T-hangars and tiedown facilities, with capacity for 175 light aircraft.

Located at the airport are the Pearson Air Museum and Aero Maintenance Flight Center, a full service FBO, maintenance station, avionics station, and part 61 and part 141 approved flight school, and the Pearson Field Education Center.

Economic impact 
The state of Washington provides economic impact studies of airports within the state. In the 2001 report, Pearson Field contributed about 600 jobs to the area. Salaries drawn in relation to business at Pearson total about US$11 million. The total economic activity related to Pearson totals about US$38 million. There was an updated report in 2012.

See also
 Grove Field
 Hillsboro Airport
 Portland International Airport
 Portland-Troutdale Airport
 Swan Island Municipal Airport

References

External links 
 Pearson Field at City of Vancouver website
 Washington State Department of Transportation (Pearson Field)
 Pearson Air Museum 
 A video about Pearson Field, on Youtube
 Aviation: From Sand Dunes to Sonic Booms, a National Park Service Discover Our Shared Heritage Travel Itinerary
 Aviation photos of Pearson Field at Airliners.net
 

1905 establishments in Washington (state)
Airports established in 1905
Airports in Washington (state)
Transportation buildings and structures in Clark County, Washington
Transportation in Vancouver, Washington